The bodybuilding competitions at the 2021 Southeast Asian Games took place at Hanoi Sports Training and Competition Centre in Hanoi, Vietnam from 13 to 15 May 2022.

Participating nations

 (host)

The  also entered participants but were allegedly not able to fulfill prior competition requirements.

Medal table

Medalists

References

External links
  

2021 Southeast Asian Games events
2021
2021 in bodybuilding